Sonpur is a city and sub-division in the Indian state of Bihar, situated on the banks of the River Gandak (River Narayani) and Ganges River in the Saran District. Sonpur hosts Asia's largest cattle fair, which starts on Kartik Poornima.

Geography

The river Gandak must have been the route of the movement of Buddha and his followers from the Nepalese Tarai to Magadh. That is why many of the stupas and similar structures, including Ashoka pillars, are found on the banks of the river. The location of Pathar ki Masjid just opposite the meeting point of the Gandak on the southern bank of the Ganges, shows the Muslim influence of trade and commerce in medieval times. The current township, Patna, is just the modern version of the makeshift headquarters of military establishments of old Patna city which in turn was a later version of Pataliputra, the capital of Maurya Empire.

Transportation and connectivity
Sonepur is in the Saran District of Bihar and is easily accessible via railways, roadways, and waterways.

Roadways
Sonepur is nearly 3 km from Hajipur, 25 km from Patna, 58 km from Muzaffarpur in Bihar and 60 km from Chhapra, the headquarters of Saran District. Buses, taxis and uuto-rickshaws are easily available.

Railways

The nearest railway station is Sonepur Junction railway station. It has trains connecting almost every part of India. It is the divisional headquarters of the East Central Railway of the Indian Railways.

Waterways
The Bihar State Tourism Development Corporation (BSTDC) organizes ferries to Sonepur during the Sonepur Cattle Fair.

Airways
The nearest airport to Sonepur is the Jay Prakash Narayan International Airport at Patna, 25 km away.

Real estate boom
Real estate prices soared in Sonepur after the start of construction of Digha–Sonepur rail–cum–road bridge in 2002. Real estate companies are acquiring large chunks of land and dividing them into small plots.

Cattle fair

Sonepur Cattle Fair is held annually in Sonepur. The sight of numerous elephants, decorated for the purpose of sale, is an important visitor attraction.

The fair is held on Kartik Poornima (the full moon day) in November. It is also known as Harihar Kshetra Mela and attracts visitors from all over Asia. To date, it is the second largest cattle fair of India and stretches on from fifteen days to one month. It has its origins in ancient times. This is where Chandragupta Maurya (340 – 297 BCE) used to buy elephants and horses across the river Ganges. The Sonepur Cattle Fair once attracted traders from places as distant as Central Asia. In 2001, the number of elephants brought to Sonpur Mela was 92, 354 elephants in 2004, while in 2016, 13 elephants made it to the fair, only for display, not for sale. In 2017, there were three tuskers at the fair. Sonpur Mela continues to attract foreign tourists who come to see various elements of rural settlement. Apart from the photo opportunity, elephants continue to lure foreign tourists. Swiss cottages are set up by Bihar State Tourism Development Corporation (BSTDC) at the Sonepur fair, with facilities of Internet access, motor boat rides on the Gandak, food at the tourist village and pre-paid taxis from Patna Airport to Sonpur fair. Disneyland park is set up during the Sonpur Mela. A 'railgram' stall is set up by railways, with toy trains is also erected for children.

In 2017 Sonepur Harihar Kshetra Mela will run from 2 November and finish on 3 December. It will be for 32 days. The fair will include events like boat racing, Dangal, water surfing, and water bath canning.

Hariharnath Mandir
Hariharnath Mandir in Sonepur is also known for the famous temple of shree Hariharnath and the site of the battle of Gaj-Grah and rescue of the former by Hari. During Kartik Purnima Ganga Snan or ceremonial bathing in the Ganges is held by Hindus to be unusually efficacious. On the day of full moon (Kartik Purnima) immense crowds assemble and bathe. Mela commences on that day and lasts for more than a fortnight. The Shiva temple, Kali temple and other temples and historical religious monuments are situated here and social and economical activities are at the highest peak during the Mela period. People come here to pay their oblation to the lords and thus its importance is not within Sonepur of Bihar rather it is of India and world fame.

According to Uday Pratap Singh, author of the book Baba Hariharanath, before 1757, the Hariharanath temple was composed of artistic rock clusters of timber and black stones. These pictures and praises of Hari were engraved on them. Meanwhile, this temple was reconstructed by Ram Narayan Singh, the deputy sub-ruler of Mir Qasim. He was a resident of Nayagaon, Saran. After this, in 1860, the Empress of Tekai built a hospice in the temple premises. In 1871, the remaining three oases of the temple complex were constructed by Maharana Jangbahadur of Nepal. In the 1934 Nepal–Bihar earthquake, the temple complex, Osara and Pakora were damaged. After this Birla family rebuilt it. The English writer Harry Abbott has highlighted the importance of this temple in his diary while visiting the Harihar Nath Temple. In 1871, English writer Minden Wilson described the Sonpur fair in his diary.

Education
Education services in Sonepur are provided by private parties, as well as government schools and colleges.

1. Akshara School is amongst the most reputed schools in the city. The school was founded in 2007. This school mainly helps prepare for India's esteemed schools like Sainik School, RIMC, Ramakrishna Mission, Oak Grove School, Mahamaya Girls Inter College, Navodaya, and Gurukul Vidyapeeth. 

2. Kendriya Vidyalaya is one of the notable schools and goes up to the senior secondary level with a science stream.

3. Ram Sundar Das Mahila Mahavidyalay, Sonpur. SPS Seminary School is one of the famous and old schools in this small town which is up to 10+2. P.R.College is one of the oldest colleges of Sonepur, providing bachelor's degrees in Arts and Science and affiliated to Jai Prakash University, Saran.

4. Other private schools like St. Joseph's Academy, Maxwell High School, Heritage Public School, Solanki Public School, JDS Public School, and DAV Academy are gaining popularity among the locals.

5. Gauttam Chowk is popular for its mobile repair center, mobile shop and coaching center etc. Babu Sukhnandan Singh's House is the oldest house in this area, around 180 years approximately.  

6. Dharohar Kala Mandir is one of the best dance and music academies of the city and teaches various forms of dance and music. Academy is run by East Central Railway.

Some of the dance forms are Bollywood, salsa, hip-hop, classical, urban hip-hop, and contemporary.   

Instruments like keyboard, tabla, harmonium, guitar, band sets, etc....  

Fitness-aerobic,zumba

See also
List of villages in Sonpur tehsil

References

Cities and towns in Saran district
Bihar articles needing expert attention